Snee may refer to:

Companies

Snee-Oosh, Inc., an animation production company principally known for its series Hey Arnold!

People
Chris Snee (born 1982), former American football player
Gordon Snee (1931–2013), British Abstract painter
John Snee (born 1974), American former film and television actor

Places
Snee Oosh, a community in the US state of Washington